Charlie Clark is a Canadian politician and the current Mayor of Saskatoon, Saskatchewan. He was first elected mayor in 2016 and was re-elected in 2020.

Early life 
Clark grew up in British Columbia and studied in both Toronto and Winnipeg. He earned bachelor's degrees in conflict resolution and education and a master's degree in environmental studies. Clark worked in mediation, restorative justice, adult education, and community economic development. He moved to Saskatoon in 2002 and worked for local non-profit community development organizations including the Core Neighbourhood Development Council and Quint Development Corporation.

Political career

Saskatoon City Councillor 
Clark was first elected to Saskatoon City Council in 2006, unseating incumbent Elaine Hnatyshyn. He was acclaimed in 2009 and re-elected by a wide margin in 2012. As a councillor Clark often championed greater transparency and alternative development strategies. He voted to ban corporate, union, and out-of-province campaign contributions in motions that were ultimately defeated, advocated for better waste management and transportation policies, and against new mega-projects.

Mayor of Saskatoon 
After 10 years as a councillor, Clark launched a bid for mayor in 2016, challenging four-term incumbent Don Atchison, who was again seeking re-election. Clark ran on a platform of better planning for future growth, including economic and environmental sustainability, as well as more focus on issues of social justice and inclusiveness. The 2016 election became a tight three-way race when another challenger, Kelley Moore, declared her candidacy. Clark's campaign was buoyed by a large team of more than 800 volunteers and several high-profile endorsements, including a late-campaign endorsement from actor Zach Galifianakis, to whom Clark is related. Despite trailing in the polls late in the campaign, Clark was elected mayor, defeating Atchison by a margin of over 3,000 votes.

During his first term, Clark oversaw the development of new community partnerships focused on economic and social development, public safety and harm reduction, and sustainability. He championed initiatives like the Safe Community Action Alliance, the city's Low Emissions Community Plan, a new rapid-transit system, and active transportation infrastructure. His long-time support for protected bicycle lanes led to opponents labelling Clark "Bike Lane Charlie." He also drew a sharp contrast with former mayor Atchison, who never attended a pride parade during his 13-year tenure as mayor, when he grand-marshaled the 2017 pride parade.

Clark ran for a second term as mayor in 2020 amidst the COVID-19 pandemic. He ran on a platform of economic recovery, inclusive growth, and addressing the root causes of crime. He was challenged by former provincial MLA and cabinet minister Rob Norris, who was accused of organizing a slate of candidates in the election - a charge Norris denied. Atchison also entered the race in a bid to reclaim the mayor's chair. Clark, Norris, and Atchison were joined in the race by Cary Tarasoff, Zubair Sheik, and Mark Zielke. The date of the election was initially moved by the provincial government so as not to conflict with the 2020 provincial election, and was then postponed by a severe blizzard. Clark was ultimately re-elected to his second term by a wide margin.

Personal life 
Clark is married to law professor Sarah Buhler. They have three children Simon ,Ben and Rachel .

Election results

See also 

 List of mayors of Saskatoon
 Saskatoon City Council

References

External links 

 Mayor's Biography

Mayors of Saskatoon
Living people
21st-century Canadian politicians
Year of birth missing (living people)

Saskatoon city councillors